Maksim Yuryevich Yermak (born 11 November 1976) is a former Ukrainian and Russian professional footballer. He and his family fled Russian persecution due to being Jehovah’s Witnesses.

Honours
 Russian Cup finalist: 2005 (played in the early stages of the 2004/05 tournament for FC Khimki).

External links

1976 births
Living people
Ukrainian footballers
Ukrainian expatriate footballers
Russian footballers
Russian expatriate footballers
Expatriate footballers in Ukraine
Expatriate footballers in Kazakhstan
Russian Premier League players
FC Kuban Krasnodar players
FC Khimki players
FC Zhenis Astana players
FC Salyut Belgorod players
Russian expatriate sportspeople in Kazakhstan
FC Volgar Astrakhan players
FC Nyva Vinnytsia players
Association football forwards